The Corsican Dog (chien corse) or Cursinu, is a breed of dog originating from Corsica. It has existed on the island since the 16th century, but went into decline during the late 20th century; however it was saved and became recognized by the Société Centrale Canine. Used for a variety of working purposes, it has no specific health issues.

History
Corsican Dogs have been known on Corsica since the 16th century. Until the 1950s, the breed was used as a versatile hunting and farming dog on the island. During the second half of the 20th century the breed suffered due to competition from continental breeds. In 1989 the L'association de Sauvegarde du Chien Corse was set up to safeguard the breed.

The breed has been recognised by the Société Centrale Canine, the French kennel club, since 2003; it is placed in the spitz and primitive group breeds, as a primitive  breed.

Description
The breed measures  at the withers with male dogs being slightly larger than females. Their coat can be fringed, with usual colors being brindle, fawn, black and tan or brown. The presence of a melanistic mask is permitted under the breed standard. White markings can be on the chest or the legs. The skin of the dog adheres closely to the body, and dewlaps do not appear in the breed. Corsican dogs can also have a long, fluffy coat.

Temperament 
The Corsican dog is docile, loyal and very attached to its owner. It is wary of strangers. It's an intelligent, calm and stable dog capable of adapting itself to many situations. Calm at home, it explodes with energy and speed when in action. In general, until they turn 1 year old, Corsican dogs are very hyperactive, but even as adults they remain energetic. They are very independent, they rarely bark, and they are sociable. They are good and  gentle with kids.

Use
It is a versatile breed, having been used as a sheepdog, as well as to herd cattle and in some instances for dog fighting. In hunting it is most often used in hunting wild boar, but has been used for fox and hare. It is still used as a herding dog, a watchdog and for companionship. It may require further training than some other breeds, but can become a pleasant companion to its owner.

There are no breed-specific health issues.

Education
This breed may require more patience with training because they are born with a strong natural hunting instinct that make them sometimes forget what's happening around them. Once they are educated, they are obedient.

Living conditions
Corsican dogs can adapt to any temperature as long as it's consistent. They can live outside or inside the house. They generally live up to 10 or 15 years and can damage furniture if they're bored, especially as puppies.

Health
They have a very strong immunity and need very little maintenance. They do not need a specific type of food, but they require a lot of exercise. Their coat should be brushed occasionally even if they aren't losing hair. A little bit of hair loss occurs twice a year.

References

Dog breeds originating in France
Herding dogs
Hunting dogs